The Palestinian–Serbian relations are bilateral relations between the State of Palestine and the Republic of Serbia. Relations between Serbia and Palestine have been very close and friendly. Even though Serbia had reestablished relations with Israel in 1991, its relations with Palestine still remain excellent.

As proof of the strength of the relations between the two nations, Serbia voted in favor of Palestine on several occasions, including the UN General Assembly vote rejecting the United States' decision to move its embassy in Israel to Jerusalem.

Serbian envoy to Egypt, H.E Jugoslav Vukadinovic, Ambassador Extraordinary and Plenipotentiary, is currently in charge of the Serbian diplomatic representation in Palestine until the opening of a representative office for Serbia in Ramallah.

Historical relations 
The Socialist Federal Republic of Yugoslavia under Josip Broz Tito had established diplomatic relations with Israel in 1948. After the Six-Day War in 1967, the SFRY had cut off all diplomatic relations with Israel and did not restore them until 1991. Tito had strongly supported Yasser Arafat and the Palestine Liberation Organization. Yasser Arafat was one of the dignitaries who had visited Belgrade after the death of Tito on 8 May 1980. Yugoslavia had recognized the State of Palestine on 16 November 1988 and had established full diplomatic relations with it by 1989. During the Yugoslav wars in the 1990s, Palestine had recognised  the Federal Republic of Yugoslavia (then Serbia and Montenegro) and all the other former Yugoslav republics.

In late 1999, during a time when Serbia's government was increasingly isolated internationally for its actions in the Yugoslav Wars, the Palestinian Authority invited Serbian President Slobodan Milošević to celebrate Orthodox Christmas in the city of Bethlehem in the West Bank. Israel, meanwhile, threatened to turn President Milošević over to the International Criminal Court if he ever crossed Israeli-controlled borders. In the end, Milošević did not attend the ceremonies.

A memorandum of understanding was signed between the Ministries of Foreign Affairs of Serbia and Palestine on 9 June 2015 during the visit of President Mahmoud Abbas to Belgrade. It was agreed to hold consultations on an annual basis, as well as the development of economic relations and the opening of cooperation programs in various sectors.

A parliamentary Palestinian-Serbian Friendship Committee between the National Assembly of Serbia and the Palestinian National Council was formed in 2000. The Friendship Committee was formed by members of the Serbian Parliament representing the ruling coalition parties: the Serbian Progressive Party, the Socialist Party and the Social Democratic Party.

As part of the "World in Serbia" educational program, in the period 2009–2017 Serbia provided more than seventy scholarships for Palestine in various disciplines.

In a remarkable development in bilateral relations, Serbia abstained from supporting seven successive UN General Assembly resolutions related to the Palestinian cause passed on 4 November 2020 shortly after the conclusion of the Kosovo–Serbia Economic Agreement in early September.

Mutual visits 
Tomislav Nikolić, President of the Republic of Serbia, visited Palestine at the invitation of President Abu Mazen on 1 May 2013.

President Mahmoud Abbas visited Serbia accompanied by Riyad al-Maliki on 11 June 2015 and opened the headquarters of the Embassy of Palestine to Serbia in the capital Belgrade, in the presence of the President of the Republic of Serbia, Tomislav Nikolić, and a number of Arab Ambassadors and the Ambassador of the State of Palestine to Serbia, Mohammad Nabhan.

Palestinian President Mahmoud Abbas met in Addis Ababa with Serbian President Tomislav Nikolić on the sidelines of the 26th session of the African Union summit, which Ethiopia hosted on 30 January 2016.

Serbian Foreign Minister Ivica Dačić visited the city of Bethlehem and met with Riyad al-Maliki on 6 January 2017.

Opposition to Kosovo Independence 
Palestine is strongly against the independence of Kosovo. In February 2008, two senior Palestinian officials representing the Mahmoud Abbas West Bank-controlling government, who also are part of the team negotiating with Israel, disagreed on what the Kosovo events implied for Palestine. Yasser Abed Rabbo said, "If things are not going in the direction of continuous and serious negotiations, then we should take the step and announce our independence unilaterally. Kosovo is not better than us. We deserve independence even before Kosovo, and we ask for the backing of the United States and the European Union for our independence". Saeb Erekat responded that the Palestine Liberation Organization had already declared independence in 1988. "Now we need real independence, not a declaration," said Erekat, "We need real independence by ending the occupation. We are not Kosovo. We are under Israeli occupation and for independence we need to acquire independence".

After a July 2009 state visit to Serbia, President Mahmoud Abbas in a meeting with the Serbian President Boris Tadić, when discussing both the situations in the Middle East and Kosovo said, "We are looking for a way to resolve these problems in a peaceful way, by upholding international law. We cannot impose solutions nor can we accept imposed solutions. That is why we must negotiate". In September 2011, during the meeting of Foreign Ministers of the Non-Aligned Movement summit in Belgrade, the Palestinian Ambassador to the UN Riyad Mansour said that Palestine was a "typical foreign occupation which cannot be compared to the issue of Kosovo" as confirmed by international law and the UN.

In 2014 Palestinian Ambassador to Serbia Muhammad Nabhan said that "Kosovo has always been part of Serbia", that thus unlike Israel in the Palestinian territories, that Serbia has "never occupied Kosovo," and that "Palestinians”
support Serbia and still do".

Gaza War and its aftermath 
During the 2008–2009 Gaza War, Foreign Minister Vuk Jeremić said "We are joining the voice of the whole world, which condemns the violence in Gaza, and we call for the stopping of missile attacks on Israel and Israeli attacks against the Gaza strip". Ministry of Foreign Affairs issued a statement saying "Ministry of Foreign Affairs of the Republic of Serbia condemns attacks in the Gaza Strip, and calls for calming of military actions in which guiltless civilians are killed. The Republic of Serbia welcomes the decision of the U.N. Security Council and joins in with the rest of the world in condemning the violence in the Middle East. Republic of Serbia is committed to a peaceful resolution of all conflicts, and calls on both sides to stop the attacks which cause a humanitarian catastrophe." President of the National Assembly Slavica Đukić Dejanović accepted a proposal of the Greek Parliament President for a regional conference aimed at ending the escalating violence in the Middle East. After 31 May 2010 Gaza flotilla raid, the Serbian Ministry of Foreign Affairs condemned the excessive use of force which caused the deaths of innocent civilians. It also endorsed the UN Security Council's call for an immediate and impartial investigation into the incident.

On 23 June 2010 at a summit of Balkan countries in Istanbul, Serbia was one of the countries that strongly condemned Israel's attack on the aid flotilla as well as the loss of life. In October 2011, Serbia voted to recognize Palestine as UNESCO's 195th member, against Israel's wishes. Belgrade declared that it would not have opposed a resolution recognizing Palestinian sovereignty, had one come before the UN General Assembly. On 29 November 2012 Serbia followed through with such promises, voting to welcome Palestine as the newest member of the United Nations by voting in favor of United Nations General Assembly resolution 67/19. That resolution made Palestine a non-member observer state just like the Vatican.

During the 2014 Gaza War, Serbian Prime Minister Aleksandar Vučić stated that Serbia respects the right of the state of Israel to existence and a peaceful life of its citizens, and expressed hope that the situation will be resolved peacefully and that everyday life will return to normal.

See also 

 Israel–Serbia relations

References

External links 
 Palestinian Ministry of Foreign Affairs

 
Bilateral relations of Serbia
Serbia